Florent Jodoin (24 December 1922 – 9 March 2008) was a Canadian cyclist. He competed in the individual and team road race events at the 1948 Summer Olympics.

References

External links
 

1922 births
2008 deaths
Canadian male cyclists
Olympic cyclists of Canada
Cyclists at the 1948 Summer Olympics
Cyclists from Quebec
People from Varennes, Quebec
20th-century Canadian people
21st-century Canadian people